The Sturges' Rifles (also spelled Sturgis) was an infantry company that served in the Union Army during the American Civil War.

Service
The Sturges' Rifles were a company of Illinois militia sharpshooters mustered into Federal service on May 6, 1861.  The company served as part of Major General George B. McClellan's headquarters bodyguard throughout his command. McClellan had been a member of the company prior to the war and outfitted them with the Sharps rifle, an expensive rifle not issued to regular infantrymen.

The company was mustered out on November 25, 1862.

Total strength and casualties

The unit had one enlisted man die of disease, for a total of one fatality.

Commanders
Captain James Steel

See also
List of Illinois Civil War Units
Illinois in the American Civil War

Notes

References
The Civil War Archive

Units and formations of the Union Army from Illinois
1861 establishments in Illinois
Military units and formations established in 1861
Military units and formations disestablished in 1862